The Chemoaffinity hypothesis states that neurons make connections with their targets based on interactions with specific molecular markers  and, therefore, that the initial wiring diagram of an organism is (indirectly) determined by its genotype. The markers are generated during cellular differentiation and aid not only with synaptogenesis, but also act as guidance cues for their respective axon.

Sperry's experiments
Roger Wolcott Sperry pioneered the inception of the Chemoaffinity Hypothesis following his 1960s experiments on the African Clawed Frog. He removed the eye of a frog and rotated it 180°, Sperry then replaced the eye and the visual nervous system repaired itself. However, the frog now had inverted vision. Initial eye orientation gives that the top of the eye is Dorsal, and the bottom is Ventral. Post-operation, the "top" of the eye is now Ventral, and the bottom is Dorsal. When a food source was above the frog, it extended its tongue downwards; meaning that the Dorsal-Ventral orientation of the eye still remained. In follow up experiments, the eye was detached and rotated 180° and the optic nerve was also cut to see if this would affect the Dorsal-Ventral orientation. The results were identical. 

Sperry concluded that each individual optic nerve and tectal neuron used some form of chemical marker which dictated their connectivity during development. He reasoned that when the eye had been rotated,  each optic fiber and each tectal neuron possessed cytochemical labels that uniquely denoted their neuronal type and position and that optic fibers could utilize these labels to selectively navigate to their matching target cell, hence the visuomotor impairment.

See also
Neural development

References

Neurophysiology